John Edwards (1751–1832) was an Anglo-Irish soldier and poet.

Life
Edwards was the eldest son of James Edwards of Old Court, County Wicklow, Ireland, by his wife Anne Tenison, second daughter of Thomas Tenison of Castle Tenison, County Roscommon, Ireland, a son of Archbishop Thomas Tenison. He became an officer of light dragoons in the volunteer army of Ireland, and rose to the rank of lieutenant-colonel. Edwards died owner of Old Court in 1832. He married Charlotte Wright, fifth daughter of John Wright of Nottingham, who bore him three sons and two daughters.

Works
In honour of the force to which he belonged he wrote The Patriot Soldier: a Poem, Nottingham, 1784, 38 pp. He also published Kathleen: a Ballad from Ancient Irish Tradition, 1808; Abradates and Panthea; a Tragedy, 1808; Interests of Ireland, London, 1815, and an essay on the improvement of bank-notes, Liverpool, 1820.

References

Attribution

1751 births
1832 deaths
18th-century Irish poets
19th-century Irish poets
Irish male poets
People from County Wicklow
18th-century Irish male writers